Polycyclohexylenedimethylene terephthalate (PCT) is a thermoplastic polyester formed from the polycondensation of terephthalic acid and cyclohexanedimethanol.  Its chemical structure is similar to that of polyethylene terephthalate (PET), with which it shares properties like dimensional stability and chemical resistance. PCT is also particularly resistant to high temperatures and hydrolysis. The melting point is 545 °F (285 °C). Common brand names are Thermx (Ticona), Eastar (Eastman) and SkyPURA (SK Chemicals).

Application 
Polycyclohexylenedimethylene terephthalate has good dimensional stability at excess temperatures (short-term up to 493 °F (256 °C)) making this material suitable for injection molding or 3D printing of thin-walled parts. PCT is used for electronics components like plug connectors. PCT is also processed into filaments, fibers, and fabrics that are used in industry as filters. The color stability and lower density are of advantage in other applications, especially in the LED reflector application.

References

External links 
 PCT using the example of Thermx (PDF)
 Polycyclohexylenedimethylene terephthalate (PCT) on MatWeb

Polyesters
Thermoplastics
Terephthalate esters